George Eulan Howard (June 3, 1935November 21, 2018) was an American Hebraist, noted for his publication of an old Hebrew edition of Matthew. He was a full Professor Emeritus and Head of the Department of Religion and Hebrew (Ret.) at the University of Georgia, Athens, GA. Howard also was a former President of the Society of Biblical Literature, Southeastern Region.

Life 
Howard was born in Holdenville, Oklahoma.

Education 
Howard received a bachelor's degree from David Lipscomb College (Nashville) in 1957, a master's degree in theology from Harding School of Theology (Memphis) in 1961, and a PhD from Hebrew Union College-Jewish Institute of Religion in 1964. He also studied at Vanderbilt and the Hebrew University of Jerusalem.

Academic work

Teaching 
He first taught at David Lipscomb College (from 1964 as Assistant Professor for Religion, 1967 Associate Professor) before moving to the University of Georgia in 1968 as Assistant Professor of Classics. There he was appointed Associate Professor for Religion in 1972 and (Full) Professor in 1978.

Organizations 
Howard was Treasurer of the International Organization for Septuagint and Cognate Studies (IOSCS) from 1972 to 1974. Due to Sidney Jellicoe's illness, Howard was temporarily editor of the Bulletin of the International Organization for Septuagint and Cognate Studies, and from 1973 to 1979 (Bulletin 6 through 12) Howard was editor of BIOSCS. In the Society of Biblical Literature Howard was chairman from 1977 to 1979, a member of the editorial board from 1979 to 1981, president of the Southeastern region from 1980 to 1981 and vice president of the Southeastern region from 1982 to 1984.

Works

Theses

Books

Articles

References

1935 births
2018 deaths
American Hebraists
Hebrew Union College – Jewish Institute of Religion alumni
Harding University alumni
Lipscomb University alumni
University of Georgia faculty
Lipscomb University faculty